Wörrstadt is a Verbandsgemeinde ("collective municipality") in the district Alzey-Worms, Rhineland-Palatinate, Germany. The seat of the Verbandsgemeinde is in Wörrstadt.

The Verbandsgemeinde Wörrstadt consists of the following Ortsgemeinden ("local municipalities"):

 Armsheim
 Ensheim
 Gabsheim
 Gau-Weinheim
 Partenheim
 Saulheim
 Schornsheim
 Spiesheim
 Sulzheim
 Udenheim
 Vendersheim
 Wallertheim
 Wörrstadt

Verbandsgemeinde in Rhineland-Palatinate